Alex Michael Bowman (born April 25, 1993) is an American professional stock car racing driver and team owner. He competes full-time in the NASCAR Cup Series, driving the No. 48 Chevrolet Camaro ZL1 for Hendrick Motorsports. He owns a Dirt Midget and Sprint car racing team Alex Bowman Racing. He is known for a record six consecutive front-row starts in the Daytona 500, from 2018 to 2023, winning the pole in 2018, 2021, and 2023. Bowman has developed a reputation among his fellow drivers as a closer; Three of his seven wins have come after Bowman passed the leader with ten or fewer laps to go.

He is known by many nicknames, the most predominant being "Bowman the Showman.” Denny Hamlin called him "just a hack" after a late-race collision at Martinsville in 2021 took Hamlin out of contention for the win. Following a 2022 race at Las Vegas, Kyle Busch said Bowman was "all luck, no skill" after Bowman won the race by taking 2 tires on a pit stop during a late-race caution.

Racing career

Beginnings
A native of Tucson, Arizona, Bowman started his racing career on short tracks in Arizona and California in 2000 at the age of seven, driving quarter midget cars in United States Auto Club (USAC) competition. By 2006, he had won nine national championships and had 165 feature wins.

Midget racing
In 2008, he won the USAC National Focus Midget championship with 11 wins, as well as the California Dirt Focus Midget championship. In 2009, he was named USAC National Midget Rookie of the Year. In February 2010, Bowman was injured in an accident during a USAC race, suffering a fractured clavicle and rib. Bowman continues to field a midget in select races, competing himself at the 2016 Chili Bowl and fielding a car for driver Ryan Smith in 2017.

K&N Pro Series
In 2010, at the age of 17, he moved to full-bodied stock car racing, making two Rev-Oil Pro Cup starts and a late model start. Bowman moved to the NASCAR K&N Pro Series East with X Team Racing for 2011. Bowman finished sixth in series points, winning Rookie of the Year.
In 2018, Bowman made his return to the west series at Sonoma Raceway, driving the No. 24 for Bill McAnally Racing.

ARCA Racing Series
Bowman also competed in two ARCA Racing Series events during 2011 for Venturini Motorsports, at Madison International Speedway and Kansas Speedway, winning both events.

He moved full-time to ARCA for 2012 for Cunningham Motorsports as a development driver for Penske Racing, winning races at Salem Speedway, Winchester Speedway, Iowa Speedway, and Kansas Speedway over the course of the year. He also won the pole for the inaugural ARCA Mobile 200 at Mobile International Speedway.

Xfinity and Truck Series

2012
Also in 2012, Bowman made his debut at the national level of NASCAR competition, driving for Turner Motorsports in the Nationwide Series at Chicagoland Speedway. He finished 17th in his debut race; he also drove for RAB Racing in the Nationwide Series at Kentucky Speedway and Phoenix International Raceway, and for Turner at Dover International Speedway, towards the end of 2012.

2013
In January 2013, it was announced that Bowman would be running the full Nationwide Series season for RAB in 2013, competing for Rookie of the Year honors. He would win his first career Nationwide pole at the O'Reilly Auto Parts 300 at Texas. Bowman would win another pole at Texas later in the season, but was released by the team prior to the season-ending race at Homestead-Miami Speedway. Bowman ended the season with six top-tens in 32 starts.

2014
Bowman returned to the Nationwide Series in 2014, driving the No. 80 for Hattori Racing Enterprises at Dover, while driving the No. 5 JR Motorsports Chevy at Charlotte and Phoenix.

2015
During the 2015 season, Bowman made starts in the Xfinity (formerly Nationwide) Series with Athenian Motorsports and a Camping World Truck Series race with JRM.

2016
On November 11, Bowman joined JRM for nine races in the No. 88 for the 2016 Xfinity season. He won a pole at Michigan and finished in the top-ten in all but two races. Despite the success, Bowman struggled to find sponsorship that would grant him the opportunity to race full-time for JRM.

2017
In 2017, Bowman joined GMS Racing to run the Truck Series race at Atlanta in the No. 24 as a fill-in driver for Justin Haley, who was too young to race at the track. In October and November, Bowman drove the No. 42 Xfinity car of Chip Ganassi Racing at Charlotte and Phoenix. At Charlotte, Bowman dominated the final portion of the race following a late restart to win his first NASCAR national series race.

2022

In 2022, it was announced by Spire Motorsports that Bowman would be driving their #7 truck series entry at COTA with sponsorship from HendrickCars.com.

Cup Series
BK Racing (2014)

In January 2014, Bowman tested for BK Racing as part of Preseason Thunder before the 2014 Daytona 500 in the No. 83. On January 20, the team announced his hiring for the No. 23 car for 2014, running the full 2014 NASCAR Sprint Cup Series season for Rookie of the Year.

Tommy Baldwin Racing (2015)

On January 30, 2015, it was announced that Bowman would drive the full 2015 NASCAR Sprint Cup Series season in the No. 7 car for Tommy Baldwin Racing. He failed to qualify for the Daytona 500 after he was caught up in a multi-car wreck in his duel race. In New Hampshire, his car erupted in flames after rubber from a blown tire got into the engine. He was able to return to the track. On the final lap, he blew a tire causing to smack the wall before the caution came out. On January 21, 2016, Bowman parted ways with Tommy Baldwin Racing, losing his Sprint Cup ride.

Hendrick Motorsports (2016–present)
2016

Bowman returned to the Cup Series at Loudon in the New Hampshire 301, driving the No. 88 for Hendrick Motorsports as an interim driver for Dale Earnhardt Jr., who would miss the remainder of the 2016 season because of concussion issues. Despite running in the top ten, including as high as eighth, Bowman blew a tire and hit the wall in turn one on lap 272, relegating him to a 26th-place finish.

Bowman and Jeff Gordon would alternate the No. 88 car for the balance of the 2016 season. Bowman won his first career pole at Phoenix. In that race, Bowman led the most laps with 197 and tried to make what would have been the winning pass on Matt Kenseth with six laps to go. While passing Kenseth, Bowman got tapped from behind by Kyle Busch, spinning Kenseth out; Bowman recovered to finish sixth.

2017–2018

In December 2016, Rick Hendrick announced that Bowman would run the No. 88 in place of Earnhardt Jr. for the 2017 Advance Auto Parts Clash at Daytona; while Earnhardt Jr. was also eligible for the event, he elected to allow Bowman drive the car out of appreciation for substituting in 2016. Bowman finished third after losing out in a side-by-side battle for second with Kyle Busch. When Earnhardt Jr. announced his retirement in the spring, he expressed support for Bowman to replace him in the No. 88 for the 2018 season. On July 20, Hendrick Motorsports formally named Bowman as the driver of the No. 88 car in 2018.

Bowman opened up the 2018 season on February 11 by winning the pole for the 2018 Daytona 500. Despite being winless, he made his Playoff debut by staying consistent with two top-fives and nine top-10s. After the Charlotte Roval race, Bowman advanced to the Round of 12. Bowman was eliminated from the Round of 12 after the fall Kansas race and finished 16th in points.

2019

The 2019 season saw improvement in Bowman's finishes, including three consecutive second-place finishes at Talladega, Dover, and Kansas. At Kansas, Bowman dominated the later portion of the race but was passed by Brad Keselowski with eight laps to go and could not retake the lead. Bowman also made the starting grid of the 2019 Monster Energy NASCAR All-Star Race by winning the Fan Vote.

At the 2019 Camping World 400 at Chicagoland Speedway, Bowman again dominated the final stage of the race but was passed by Kyle Larson with 8 to go. However, unlike the race at Kansas, Bowman was able to pass Larson again with 6 to go and won his first Cup Series race. With the win, Bowman has finished in every possible position in a NASCAR Cup event. Bowman opened the first round of the playoffs with a solid 6th-place finish at Las Vegas, dismal 23rd-place at Richmond, and runner-up to Hendrick teammate Chase Elliott at the Charlotte Roval, which secured his advancement into the Round of 12. At Talladega, Bowman was leading the pack in the closing laps of Stage 2 when he was punted from behind by Joey Logano, triggering The Big One. Bowman was eliminated in the Round of 12 after the Kansas race.

2020

On March 1, 2020, Bowman got his second career NASCAR Cup Series win in the Auto Club 400 after leading 110 laps and winning stage 1. After a late pit-stop by second-placed Ryan Blaney, Bowman beat Kyle Busch by a margin of nine seconds. On October 6, Hendrick Motorsports announced that Bowman and crew chief Greg Ives would switch to the No. 48 car to replace the retiring Jimmie Johnson for the 2021 season, during which he inherited Ally Financial's sponsorship; the No. 88 would be taken over by Kyle Larson and renumbered to No. 5. Bowman finished 6th in the 2020 standings.

2021

Bowman started the 2021 season by winning the pole at the 2021 Daytona 500. After an inconsistent start to the year, Bowman won at Richmond after holding off Denny Hamlin and Joey Logano in a late race restart with 12 laps to go, his third career victory and the first time that the No. 48 returned to Victory Lane since Johnson won the 2017 AAA 400 Drive for Autism. Three weeks later, Bowman would achieve his second win of the season at the 2021 Drydene 400. On June 18, Bowman signed a contract extension with Hendrick Motorsports through 2023. He won again at the 2021 Pocono Organics CBD 325 when teammate Larson, the leader, blew a tire going into the last corner on the last lap. During the playoffs, Bowman made it to the Round of 12, but struggled with poor finishes at Las Vegas and Talladega. Following the Charlotte Roval race, he was eliminated from the Round of 8. Despite his elimination, Bowman scored his sixth career win at Martinsville. He finished the season 14th in the points standings.

2022

Bowman's 2022 season began by qualifying 2nd for the 2022 Daytona 500, but he was involved in a lap 63 crash in which he slammed into the flipping car of Harrison Burton. He was able to continue, but lost four laps, ultimately finishing 24th. The following week, at the WISE Power 400 in Fontana, Bowman was running in the top 10 when he hit the outside wall late in the race, finishing 25th. However, he won the 2022 Pennzoil 400 at Las Vegas, his seventh career victory, after battling with teammate Kyle Larson over the last couple laps. In the race at Circuit of the Americas, Bowman was in the lead heading into turn 19 on the final lap. However, Ross Chastain bumped A. J. Allmendinger into Bowman, causing him to go wide and finish second behind Chastain. A concussion sustained from his crash at Texas forced him to miss the races at Talladega, Charlotte Roval, Las Vegas, Homestead, and Martinsville, with Noah Gragson filling in the No. 48 for him. Due to his injury, Bowman was eliminated in the Round of 12. Bowman was cleared to return for the title decider race on October 28. He finished the season 16th in the points standings.

2023

Bowman began the 2023 season with an fifth place finish at the 2023 Daytona 500. On March 15, the No. 48 was served an L2 penalty after unapproved hood louvers were found installed on the car during pre-race inspection at Phoenix; as a result, the team was docked 100 driver and owner points and 10 playoff points. In addition, crew chief Blake Harris was suspended for four races and fined 100,000.

Motorsports career results

NASCAR
(key) (Bold – Pole position awarded by qualifying time. Italics – Pole position earned by points standings or practice time. * – Most laps led.)

Cup Series

Daytona 500

Xfinity Series

Camping World Truck Series

K&N Pro Series East

K&N Pro Series West

 Season still in progress
 Ineligible for series championship points

ARCA Racing Series
(key) (Bold – Pole position awarded by qualifying time. Italics – Pole position earned by points standings or practice time. * – Most laps led.)

References

External links

 
 Official profile at Hendrick Motorsports
 

Living people
1993 births
Sportspeople from Tucson, Arizona
Racing drivers from Tucson, Arizona
Racing drivers from Arizona
NASCAR drivers
ARCA Menards Series drivers
JR Motorsports drivers
Hendrick Motorsports drivers
World of Outlaws drivers
Motorsport team owners
Chip Ganassi Racing drivers